Jigme Khesar Namgyel Wangchuck (born 21 February 1980) is the Druk Gyalpo (Dzongkha: Dragon King) of the Kingdom of Bhutan. After his father Jigme Singye Wangchuck abdicated the throne in his favor, he became the monarch on 9 December 2006. A public coronation ceremony was held on 6 November 2008, a year that marked 100 years of monarchy in Bhutan.

Early life and education
Khesar was born 21 February 1980 at Paropakar Maternity and Women's Hospital in Kathmandu. He is the eldest son of the fourth Dragon king of Bhutan, Jigme Singye Wangchuck, and his third wife, Queen Ashi Tshering Yangdon. He has a younger sister, Princess Ashi Dechen Yangzom, and brother, Prince Gyaltshab Jigme Dorji, as well as four half-sisters and three half-brothers.

After completing his higher secondary studies at Yangchenphug High School, Khesar was educated in the United States at Phillips Academy in Andover and at Cushing Academy in Ashburnham, where he finished high school. He then studied at Wheaton College in Massachusetts before completing the Diplomatic Studies Programme at Magdalen College, Oxford.

Crown Prince
The Crown Prince, popularly known to the people of Bhutan as 'Dasho Khesar', accompanied his father on his many tours throughout the kingdom to meet and speak to the people. He also officially represented Bhutan on several international events. 
On 8 May 2002, he represented Bhutan at the 27th UN General Assembly and made his first speech to the United Nations, addressing issues related to the welfare of millions of children around the world. He attended Thai King Bhumibol Adulyadej's 60th Anniversary Celebrations on 12–13 June 2006 in Bangkok along with royals from 25 countries.

On 25 June 2002 the Crown Prince was awarded the Red Scarf by his father.

Trongsa Penlop
On 31 October 2004, Khesar was installed as the 16th Trongsa Penlop in Trongsa Dzong. The institution of the Trongsa Penlop, started by Zhabdrung Ngawang Namgyal in 1647, signifies the true heritage to the Bhutanese Throne and the investiture ceremony of the Trongsa Penlop is the formal declaration of this status of the Crown Prince.

Ascension to the throne
In December 2005, King Jigme Singye Wangchuck announced his intention to abdicate in his son's favour in 2008, and that he would begin handing over responsibility to him immediately. On 9 December 2006, the former king issued a Royal Edict announcing his abdication, and transferred the throne to Jigme Khesar Namgyel Wangchuck, who was officially crowned on 6 November 2008, in Punakha. Religious ceremonies and public celebrations were also held at Tashichho Dzong and Changlimithang Stadium in Thimphu. The coronation ceremony comprised an ancient and colourful ritual, attended by few selected foreign friends of the royal family and dignitaries, including the then-President of India, Pratibha Patil.

To welcome Khesar as king of Bhutan, people painted street signs, hung festive banners and decorated traffic circles with fresh flowers. He received white, yellow, red, green, and blue silk scarves.

Marriage

Royal wedding

As he opened the session of parliament on Friday, 20 May 2011, the king announced his engagement to Jetsun Pema, born in Thimphu on 4 June 1990. They were married on 13 October 2011 in Punakha Dzong. The wedding was Bhutan's largest media event ever. The ceremony was held in Punakha, followed by formal visits to different parts of the country. During the ceremony the king also received the Phoenix Crown of the Druk Gyaltsuen (Dragon queen) from the most sacred Machhen temple of the Dzong and bestowed it on Jetsun Pema, formally proclaiming her queen of the Kingdom of Bhutan. The wedding was held in traditional style with the "blessings of the guardian deities".

Children
On 11 November 2015, it was announced that the king and queen of Bhutan were expecting their first child, a son, early in 2016. They announced the arrival of their son Jigme Namgyel Wangchuck, who was born in Lingkana Palace in Thimphu, on 5 February 2016.

On 17 December 2019, it was reported that they were expecting their second child, to be born in spring 2020. Their second son was born in Lingkana Palace in Thimphu on 19 March 2020. They formally uploaded the photo of their second son on 31 March 2020, through the official Facebook page. On 30 June 2020, the Royal Family announced that the second Gyalsey had been named Jigme Ugyen Wangchuck, and would be known as His Royal Highness Gyalsey Ugyen Wangchuck.

As king

Democratisation
The young king began his reign overseeing the democratisation of Bhutan by presiding over the last sessions of the parliament where electoral laws, land reform and other important issues were debated. He said that the responsibility of this generation of Bhutanese was to ensure the success of democracy. He traveled extensively to explain and discuss the Draft Constitution of Bhutan with the people and to encourage participation in the upcoming democratic exercises. He continues such visits, speaking mainly to young people on the need for Bhutanese to strive for higher standards in education, business, civil service, and the need for people of a small country to work harder than those of others.

On 17 February 2021, he signed the abolishment of anti-homosexuality laws into law, effectively decriminalising same-sex activity in the kingdom, after the repeal of such laws had been approved by both houses in 2020. Tashi Tsheten, of the LGBT organisation Queer Voices of Bhutan, welcomed the king's decision as a milestone and expressed gratitude to the king and every politician involved in making the decriminalisation possible. Additionally, Tea Braun of the organisation Human Dignity Trust said that Bhutan had made a "step forward" by legalising homosexual activity.

Diplomacy
The king signed a new treaty of friendship with India in February 2007, replacing the treaty of 1949. Many government initiatives were undertaken by the new king with a view to strengthen the system in preparation for democratic changes in 2008. The Constitution of Bhutan was adopted on 18 July 2008 after legislation dictated that the National Council and the National Assembly was to be elected democratically.

Land reform
The king's first landmark project after his formal coronation was launching the National Cadastral Resurvey in March 2009, aimed at resolving long-standing issues of excess land that affect every Bhutanese household. A variation of land reform focuses on improving the lives of people living in remote and difficult areas, with the Rehabilitation Project. The pilot Rehabilitation Project at Khinadang in Pemagatshel was initiated in June 2011, and inaugurated by Prince Gyaltshab Jigme Dorji Wangchuck on 28 October 2014. The Project resettled people living in less accessible areas to villages, and provided them with basic amenities and services, as well as support in agriculture. The project saw tremendous success, and similar projects are in the pipeline in other parts of Bhutan.

Kidu
One of the most important and ongoing works of the king involves Kidu, a tradition based on the rule of a Dharma king whose sacred duty is to care for his people. The people can access Kidu in several ways: by applying to the Office of the Royal Chamberlain, which accepts applications during working hours; by sending applications through Dzongkhag Kidu Officers in every district, whose responsibility is to collect such applications as well as identify people who need help; and by appealing to the king directly. To give the people the opportunity for direct appeal, the king on his numerous road trips across the country stops for every potential appellant along the road.

There are several Kidu schemes designed to help certain groups of people, such as students unable to afford even the free education available in the country, elderly citizens, and those requiring medical treatment. The king has also continued the tradition of giving state land to landless farmers around the country. The ongoing project takes him to remote villages and communities. Kidu includes providing immediate assistance to victims of natural disasters. The king personally supervised the rebuilding efforts following major earthquakes and floods in 2009 and 2011.

In 2012, the king granted Nu.100 million from the Armed Forces to the Zhung Dratshang for the Dzong Reconstruction Fund, as on 24 June, the historic Wangduephodrang Dzong was destroyed by fire.

DeSuung Training Programme
The king initiated military-style training for volunteers known as the DeSuung Training Programme, DeSuung meaning "Guardians of Peace", in 2011, on the request of the youth. The programme aims to equip volunteers with the skill to provide assistance during emergencies, and has been hugely successful, with more than 3000 volunteers having completed their training and volunteering for public events and emergencies. Graduates of the program are known as DeSuups and wear orange jumpsuits. They live by the DeSuung Honour Code, which is to "keep service to their nation before their own safety and comfort".

Gyalsuung National Service
In December 2019, during the 112th National Day, the king announced the initiation of a one-year national service for all eighteen-year-olds, starting from 2022. The training includes three months of military-style training and a nine-month educational course on agriculture, entrepreneurship, computers, coding and health sciences.

Amnesty
The Constitution of Bhutan empowers the king to grant amnesty to prisoners. In 2014 he pardoned 45 prisoners who had been imprisoned for possessing an excessive amount of tobacco, following an amendment of the Tobacco Control Act of Bhutan 2010 by the Parliament of Bhutan, since the amended law could not be enforced retroactively, and previous offenders who would not be liable now would still be tried under previous laws. The Royal Pardon was granted to those who were not repeat offenders and had good prison records.

Public perception and popularity abroad
The "People's king", like his father, enjoys exceptionally warm relations with India. He has visited India on several occasions, and was invited as the Chief Guest for India's 64th Republic Day celebrations in 2013.

Following his 2006 visit to Thailand as crown prince, the king has been immensely popular in Thailand. The number of Thai tourists visiting Bhutan has increased steadily since the visit.

In November 2011, the king and Queen Jetsun Pema made a state visit to Japan; they were the first state guests to Japan since the 2011 earthquake. It was reported that the Japanese were fascinated by the king and queen of Bhutan.

In March 2015, the king and queen were among the foreign dignitaries who attended the funeral of Singapore's former Prime Minister Lee Kuan Yew.

Also, the king and the queen attended the funeral of King Bhumibol Adulyadej of Thailand in October 2017 and the enthronement ceremony of Emperor Naruhito and Empress Masako of Japan in October 2019.

Foreign honours
  : Knight Grand Cross of the Most Illustrious Order of Queen Salote Tupou III (14/05/2010).

Ancestry

See also

 House of Wangchuck
 Jigme Khesar Strict Nature Reserve

References

External links

Official Facebook Page
Bhutan's Royal Family
More Royal Family Background
Tim Fischer: Wise heads prevail in capital of happiness
Bhutan 2008 Coronation of the Fifth King (Official Website)
BBC, In pictures: Bhutan coronation
Bhutan crowns a new King (gallery)
Of Rainbows and Clouds: The Life of Yab Ugyen Dorji As Told to His Daughter

1980 births
Living people
Bhutanese Buddhists
Bhutanese monarchs
Buddhist monarchs
Wangchuck dynasty
People from Kathmandu
Alumni of Magdalen College, Oxford
Wheaton College (Massachusetts) alumni
Members of the Inner Temple
National Defence College, India alumni